Autographa is a genus of moths of the family Noctuidae.

Species

 Autographa aemula (Denis & Schiffermüller, 1775)
 Autographa ampla (Walker, [1858])
 Autographa amurica (Staudinger, 1892)
 Autographa argyrosigna (Moore, 1882)
 Autographa bimaculata (Stephens, 1830)
 Autographa bractea (Denis & Schiffermüller, 1775) - gold spangle
 Autographa buraetica (Staudinger, 1892)
 Autographa caladii (Sepp, 1855)
 Autographa californica (Speyer, 1875) - alfalfa looper
 Autographa camptosema (Hampson, 1913)
 Autographa corusca (Strecker, 1885)
 Autographa crypta Dufay, 1973
 Autographa dudgeoni (Hampson, 1913)
 Autographa excelsa (Kretschmar, 1862)
 Autographa flagellum (Walker, [1858])
 Autographa flavida Lafontaine & Dickel, 2004
 Autographa gamma (Linnaeus, 1758) - silver Y
 Autographa jota (Linnaeus, 1758) - plain golden Y
 Autographa khinjana Wiltshire, 1961
 Autographa kostjuki Klyuchko, 1984
 Autographa labrosa (Grote, 1875)
 Autographa lehri Klyuchko, 1984
 Autographa macrogamma (Eversmann, 1842)
 Autographa mandarina (Freyer, 1845)
 Autographa mappa (Grote & Robinson, 1868)
 Autographa metallica (Grote, 1875)
 Autographa monogramma (Alphéraky, 1887)
 Autographa nekrasovi Klyuchko, 1985
 Autographa nigrisigna (Walker, [1858])
 Autographa pasiphaeia (Grote, 1873)
 Autographa precationis (Guenée, 1852)
 Autographa pseudogamma (Grote, 1875)
 Autographa pulchrina (Haworth, 1809) - beautiful golden Y
 Autographa purpureofusa (Hampson, 1894)
 Autographa rubida Ottolengui, 1902
 Autographa sansoni Dod, 1910
 Autographa schalisema (Hampson, 1913)
 Autographa sinooccidentalis Chou & Lu, 1979
 Autographa speciosa Ottolengui, 1902
 Autographa ternei Klyuchko, 1984
 Autographa urupina (Bryk, 1942)
 Autographa v-alba Ottolengui, 1902
 Autographa v-minus (Oberthür, 1884)

References
 Autographa at Markku Savela's Lepidoptera and Some Other Life Forms
 Natural History Museum Lepidoptera genus database

Plusiini
Moth genera